The Biographies of Exemplary Women is a book compiled by the Han dynasty scholar Liu Xiang c. 18 BCE.  It includes 125 biographical accounts of exemplary women in ancient China, taken from early Chinese histories including Chunqiu, Zuozhuan, and the Records of the Grand Historian.  The book served as a standard Confucianist textbook for the moral education of women in traditional China for two millennia.

Description
The idealized biographies are divided into eight scrolls, including the eighth addendum from an unknown editor, as shown below.

This book follows the lièzhuàn (列傳 "arrayed biographies") biographical format established by the Chinese historian Sima Qian. The word liènǚ (列女 "famous women in history") is sometimes understood as liènǚ (烈女 "women martyrs"), which Neo-Confucianists used to mean a "woman who commits suicide after her husband's death rather than remarry; [a] woman who dies defending her honor."

The online Chinese Text Initiative at the University of Virginia provides an e-text edition of the Lienü Zhuan, including both digitized Chinese content and images of a Song dynasty woodblock edition with illustrations by Gu Kaizhi (c. 344-405 CE) of the Jin dynasty.

Biographies included
In the first chapter, titled 母儀傳 (mǔ yí zhuàn), translated to mean Matronly Models are the following biographies:

 卷一之一 有 虞 二 妃, translated to mean The Two Consorts of Youyu. In this story, Ehuang and Nüying, both daughters of Yao, were married to a man named Shun (another name for Youyu). The sisters served their husband and worked in the fields even though they were daughters of emperor. Shun's family disliked him and made many attempts to kill him, but he survived due to his own strength and the aid of his wives. He bore his family no resentment. Later, he was promoted to General Regulator and hosted people from all over. Yao tested Shun multiple times, and each time he consulted his wives who continued to serve and aid him. Shun ended up suceeding Yao and became the Son of Heaven. In this story, Ehuang and Nüying were seen as intelligent, perceptive, chaste and benevolent.
Meng Mu, the mother of Mencius (孟子), a single mother who raised her son carefully despite poverty
Zheng Mao (鄭瞀), advised her husband, who lost power shortly after she killed herself
Consort Ban (班婕妤), (48 BCE - 6 BCE), scholar and poet, pleaded legal cases
Empress Zhao Feiyan (趙飛燕) (c. 32 BCE – 1 BCE), empress from 16 BCE until 7 BCE, a powerful courtier
Empress Wang (王皇后) (8 BCE – 23 CE), last empress of the Western Han, refused to remarry after a coup
Empress Ma (馬皇后) (40–79 CE), empress from 60 CE until her death in 79 CE, a political advisor known for her modesty and frugality
Bo Ying (伯嬴), mother to King Zhao of Chu, fought her would-be rapist with a knife and lectured him on morality

By the coauthor Huangfu Mi:

 Zhao E (趙娥), noble of the state of Cao Wei during the Three Kingdoms period, decapitated her father's killer and turned herself in
 Xiahou Lingnu (夏侯令女), aristocrat of the state of Cao Wei during the Three Kingdoms period, refused to remarry after her husband's family were executed for treason

See also

Historiography
Chinese Historiography

References

Carlitz, Katherine. (1991). "The Social Uses of Female Virtue in Late Ming Editions of Lienu Zhuan." Late Imperial China 12.2: 117-48.
Raphals, Lisa. (1998). Sharing the Light: Representations of Women and Virtue in Early China. SUNY Press.
O'Hara, Albert Richard, tr. (1945). The position of woman in early China: according to the Lieh nu chuan, "The biographies of Chinese women". Washington, DC: Catholic University of America Press. 1955 reprint. Hong Kong: Orient Publishing Co. 1980 reprint. Westport, CT: Hyperion Press.

External links
Lienü Zhuan, University of Virginia E-text
Lienü Zhuan, ChinaKnowledge
列女傳, Chinese Text Project
Traditions of Exemplary Women: Liu Xiang's Lienü Zhuan , Anne Behnke Kinney
Chapter 11: Women & Men in Society, Gregory Smits, Topics in Premodern Chinese History

Chinese classic texts
Han dynasty texts
Han dynasty literature
1st-century BC books
Women in China
Biographical dictionaries of women
Social history of China